Novar Gardens is an inner south-western suburb of Adelaide, South Australia, in the City of West Torrens.

Originally to be called Morphettville, the name was changed to honour the family estate of Ronald Munro Ferguson, 1st Viscount Novar, Governor-General of Australia from 1914 to 1920, who visited the site of the future suburb in 1919. On his return to Britain, Munro Ferguson was created 1st Viscount Novar.

The historic Cummins House in Sheoak Avenue is listed on the South Australian Heritage Register.

References

Suburbs of Adelaide